Hugh Forde (born 7 May 1964) is an English professional super feather/light/light welter/welterweight boxer of the 1980s and '90s, who won the inaugural British Boxing Board of Control (BBBofC) Midlands Area super featherweight title, BBBofC British super featherweight title, and Commonwealth super featherweight title, and was a challenger for the BBBofC British light welterweight title against Ross Hale, his professional fighting weight varied from , i.e. super featherweight to , i.e. welterweight.

References

External links

1964 births
English male boxers
Lightweight boxers
Light-welterweight boxers
Living people
Boxers from Birmingham, West Midlands
Super-featherweight boxers
Welterweight boxers